William Peter Mullins (born 15 September 1956) is an Irish racehorse trainer and former jockey.

Career
He commenced racehorse training in 1988  having previously worked as an assistant to his father Paddy Mullins and Jim Bolger. Willie is a former six times amateur champion jockey in Ireland, winning the 1983 Aintree Fox Hunters' Chase on Atha Cliath and the 1996 Cheltenham Bumper on Wither Or Which.

He is the trainer of the 2005 Grand National winner Hedgehunter and the 2011 and 2013 Champion Hurdle winner Hurricane Fly and trained the horse, Vautour in the 2016 Ryanair Chase. He is also trainer of the six times David Nicholson Mares' Hurdle champion, Quevega. In the 2015 Cheltenham Festival Willie Mullins trained 8 winners which is a joint record at the Cheltenham Festival that Gordon Elliott equalled in 2018. He is the leading most winning trainer at the Cheltenham festival and was awarded in their prestigious hall of fame.In 2022 he trained a record 10 winners at the festival.

Mullins' long lasting relationship with Gigginstown House Stud came to an end on 28 September 2016. Despite this he was the Irish Champion trainer in the 2016/17 season.

Mullins has won both the Grand National in 2005 with Hedgehunter and the 2019 Irish Grand National with Burrows Saint, both of which were ridden by Ruby Walsh.

Personal life
Mullins is from Goresbridge, County Kilkenny, but is based at Closutton, Muine Bheag, County Carlow, Ireland. He has a son, Patrick Mullins, who is currently an amateur jockey riding mainly in Ireland for his father. Patrick is also an assistant trainer to his father. Willie's wife, Jackie, was a successful amateur rider.

Cheltenham winners (94)

Mullins is the most successful trainer in the history of the Cheltenham Festival, with 94 winners.

 Cheltenham Gold Cup  - (3)  Al Boum Photo (2019, 2020), Galopin Des Champs (2023)
 Champion Hurdle  - (4) Hurricane Fly (2011, 2013), Faugheen (2015), Annie Power (2016)
 Queen Mother Champion Chase - (2) Energumene (2022, 2023)
 Stayers' Hurdle  - (2) Nichols Canyon (2017), Penhill (2018) 
 Supreme Novices' Hurdle  - (7) Tourist Attraction (1995), Ebaziyan (2007), Champagne Fever (2013), Vautour (2014), Douvan (2015), Klassical Dream (2019), Appreciate It (2021)
 Arkle Challenge Trophy  - (5) Un de Sceaux  (2015), Douvan (2016), Footpad (2018), Duc des Genievres (2019), El Fabiolo (2023)
 David Nicholson Mares' Hurdle  - (9) Quevega (2009, 2010, 2011, 2012, 2013, 2014), Glens Melody (2015), Vroum Vroum Mag (2016), Benie Des Dieux (2018)
 Ballymore Novices' Hurdle  - (6) Fiveforthree (2008), Mikael d'Haguenet (2009), Faugheen (2014), Yorkhill (2016), Sir Gerhard (2022), Impaire Et Passe (2023)
 Broadway Novices' Chase  - (5) Florida Pearl (1998), Rule Supreme (2004), Cooldine (2009), Don Poli (2015), Monkfish (2021)
 Champion Bumper  - (12) Wither or Which (1996), Florida Pearl (1997), Alexander Banquet (1998), Joe Cullen (2000), Missed That (2005), Cousin Vinny (2008), Champagne Fever (2012), Briar Hill (2013), Relegate (2018), Ferny Hollow (2020), Sir Gerhard (2021), Facile Vega (2022)
Albert Bartlett Novices' Hurdle - (3) Penhill (2017), Monkfish (2020), The Nice Guy (2022)
 Ryanair Chase  - (5) Vautour (2016),  Un de Sceaux  (2017), Min (2020), Allaho (2021,2022)
 Triumph Hurdle  - (4) Scolardy (2002), Burning Victory (2020), Vauban (2022), Lossiemouth (2023)
 Dawn Run Mares' Novices' Hurdle  - (5) Limini (2016), Let's Dance (2017), Laurina (2018), Eglantine Du Seuil (2019),  Concertista (2020)
 National Hunt Chase Challenge Cup  - (4) Back in Focus (2013), Rathvinden (2018), Stattler (2022), Gaillard Du Mesnil (2023)
 Martin Pipe Conditional Jockeys' Handicap Hurdle  - (4) Sir Des Champs (2011), Don Poli (2014), Killultagh Vic (2015), Galopin Des Champs (2021) 
 Coral Cup  - (1) Bleu Berry (2018)
 County Handicap Hurdle  - (6) Thousand Stars (2010), Final Approach (2011), Wicklow Brave (2015), Arctic Fire (2017), Saint Roi (2020), State Man (2022)
 Golden Miller Novices' Chase  - (4) Sir Des Champs (2012), Vautour (2015), Black Hercules (2016), Yorkhill (2017)
 Liberthine Mares' Chase - (2) Colreevy (2021), Elimay (2022)
 St James's Place Festival Hunter Chase - (1) Billaway (2022)

Other major wins
 Ireland
 Irish Gold Cup       -(12) Florida Pearl (1999, 2000, 2001, 2004), Alexander Banquet (2002), Rule Supreme (2005), Kempes (2011), Quel Esprit (2012), Sir Des Champs (2013), Bellshill (2019), Kemboy (2021), Galopin Des Champs (2023)
 Punchestown Gold Cup  - (6) Florida Pearl (2002), Sir Des Champs (2013), Boston Bob (2014), Bellshill (2018), Kemboy (2019), Allaho (2022)
 Irish St. Leger  - (1) Wicklow Brave  (2016) 
 Irish Champion Hurdle  - (7) Hurricane Fly (2011, 2012, 2013, 2014, 2015), Faugheen (2016), State Man (2023)
 Punchestown Champion Hurdle  - (8) Davenport Milenium (2002), Hurricane Fly (2010, 2011, 2012, 2013), Faugheen (2015), Vroum Vroum Mag (2016), Wicklow Brave (2017)
 Punchestown Champion Chase  - (7) Micko's Dream (2001), Golden Silver (2010), Felix Yonger (2015),  Un de Sceaux  (2018,2019), Chacun Pour Soi (2021), Energumene (2022)
 Champion Stayers Hurdle  - (9) Holy Orders (2003), Fiveforthree (2009), Quevega (2010, 2011, 2012, 2013), Faugheen (2018), Klassical Dream (2021, 2022)
 Champion INH Flat Race  - (11) Maringo (1995), Cousin Vinny (2008), Lovethehigherlaw (2011), Champagne Fever (2012), Shaneshill (2014), Bellshill (2015), Blow By Blow (2016), Tornado Flyer (2018), Colreevy (2019), Kilcruit (2021), Facile Vega (2022)
 Herald Champion Novice Hurdle  - (8) Hurricane Fly (2009), Blackstairmountain (2010), Faugheen (2014), Douvan (2015), Cilaos Emery (2017), Draconien (2018), Klassical Dream (2019), Echoes in Rain (2021)
 Ryanair Novice Chase  - (9) Barker (2009), Arvika Ligeonniere (2013), Un de Sceaux (2015), Douvan (2016), Great Field (2017), Footpad (2018), Chacun Pour Soi (2019), Energumene (2021), Blue Lord (2022)
 Alanna Homes Champion Novice Hurdle  - (11) Davenport Milenium (2002), Nobody Told Me (2003), Sadlers Wings (2004), Glencove Marina (2007), Mikael d'Haguenet (2009), Un Atout (2013), Vautour (2014), Nichols Canyon (2015), Bacardys (2017), Gaillard Du Mesnil (2021), State Man (2022)
 Champion Four Year Old Hurdle  - (9) Holy Order (2001), Quatre Heures (2006), Diakali (2013), Abbyssial (2014), Petite Parisienne (2015), Apple's Jade (2016), Bapaume (2017), Saldier (2018), Vauban (2022)
 Irish Daily Mirror Novice Hurdle  - (7) The Midnight Club (2009),  Marasonnien  (2012), Killultagh Vic (2015), Bellshill (2016), Next Destination (2018), Galopin Des Champs (2021), The Nice Guy (2022)
 Mares Champion Hurdle - (8) Tarla (2010), Glens Melody (2013), Annie Power (2014,2015), Whiteout (2016), Benie Des Dieux (2018,2019), Stormy Ireland  (2021)
 Morgiana Hurdle  - (12) Padashpan (1993), Thousand Stars (2011), Hurricane Fly (2012, 2013, 2014), Nichols Canyon (2015, 2016), Faugheen (2017), Sharjah (2018,2021), Saldier (2019), State Man (2022)
 Royal Bond Novice Hurdle  - (9) Alexander Banquet (1998), Hurricane Fly (2008), Zaidpour (2010), Sous les Cieux (2011), Nichols Canyon (2014), Long Dog (2015), Airlie Beach (2016), Quick Grabim (2018), Statuaire (2021)
 Drinmore Novice Chase  - (3) Alexander Banquet (1999), Arvika Ligeonniere (2012), Valseur Lido (2014)
 Hatton's Grace Hurdle  - (3) Hurricane Fly (2010), Zaidpour (2012), Arctic Fire (2015)
 John Durkan Memorial Punchestown Chase  - (9) Florida Pearl (2001), Arvika Ligeonniere (2013), Djakadam (2015, 2016), Min (2018, 2019, 2020), Allaho (2021), Galopin Des Champs (2022)
 Racing Post Novice Chase  - (9) Missed That (2005), Blackstairmountain (2011), Arvika Ligeonniere (2012), Douvan (2015), Min  (2016), Footpad (2017), Franco De Port (2020), Ferny Hollow (2021), Saint Roi (2022)
 Paddy Power Dial-A-Bet Chase  - (5) Golden Silver (2009), Twinlight  (2014), Douvan  (2016), Chacun Pour Soi (2020), Blue Lord (2022)
 Paddy Power Future Champions Novice Hurdle  - (7) Hurricane Fly (2008), Long Dog (2015),  Saturnas  (2016), Whiskey Sour (2017), Aramon (2018),  Appreciate It (2020), Facile Vega (2022)
  Christmas Hurdle - (4) Mourad (2010), Zaidpour (2013), Vroum Vroum Mag (2016), Klassical Dream (2021)
 Savills Chase  - (2) Don Poli (2015), Kemboy (2018)
 December Festival Hurdle  - (10) Hurricane Fly (2010, 2012, 2013, 2014), Nichols Canyon (2015), Sharjah (2018, 2019, 2020,2021), State Man (2022)
 Fort Leney Novice Chase  - (3) Don Poli (2014), Monkfish (2020), Gaillard Du Mesnil (2022)
 Greenmount Park Novice Chase  - (7) Financial Reward (2008), Sir Des Champs (2011), The Paparrazi Kid (2013), Outlander (2015), Bellshill (2016), Faugheen (2019), Colreevy (2020)
 Slaney Novice Hurdle  - (8) Homer Wells (2005), Mikael D'haguenet (2009), Gagewell Flyer (2011), Briar Hill (2014), Mckinley (2015), Bellshill (2016), Next Destination (2018), Champ Kiely (2023)
 Arkle Novice Chase  - (9)  Assessed (2002),  Missed That (2006), Golden Silver (2009), Un de Sceaux (2015), Douvan (2016),  Footpad (2018), Energumene (2021), Blue Lord (2022), El Fabiolo (2023)
 Dublin Chase  - (6) Min (2018, 2019), Chaucun Pour Soi (2020, 2021,2022), Gentleman De Mee (2023)
 Golden Cygnet Novice Hurdle  - (8) Boston Bob (2012), Pont Alexandre (2013), Sure Reef (2014), Outlander (2015), A Toi Phil (2016), Let's Dance (2017), Gaillard Du Mesnil (2021), Minella Cocooner (2022)
 Spring Juvenile Hurdle  - (5) Mister Hight (2006) Petite Parisienne (2015), Footpad (2016),  Mr Adjudicator (2018), Vauban (2022), Gala Marceau (2023)
 Chanelle Pharma Novice Hurdle  - (11) Alexander Banquet (1999), Champagne Fever (2013), Vautour (2014), Nichols Canyon (2015), Bleu Et Rouge (2016), Bacardys (2017), Klassical Dream (2019), Asterion Forlonge (2020), Appreciate It (2021), Sir Gerhard (2022), Il Etait Temps (2023)
 Dr P. J. Moriarty Novice Chase  - (10) Florida Pearl (1998), J'y Vole (2008), Cooldine (2009), Citizen Vic (2010), Boston Bob (2013),  Ballycasey (2014), Outlander (2016), Faugheen (2020), Monkfish (2021), Galopin Des Champs (2022)
 Mares Novice Hurdle Championship Final  - (6) Nobody Told Me (2003), Annie Power (2013), Adriana Des Mottes (2014),Augusta Kate (2017), Laurina (2018), Brandy Love (2022)
 Boylesports Gold Cup  - (4)  Al Boum Photo (2018), Voix Du Reve (2019), Janidil (2021), Galopin Des Champs (2022)
 Dooley Insurance Group Champion Novice Chase  - (5)  Kempes (2010), Sir Des Champs (2012), Valseur Lido (2015), Colreevy (2021), Capodanno (2022)     
 Ladbrokes Champion Chase - (1) Florida Pearl (1999)

 Saudi Arabia
 Neom Turf Cup - (1) True Self (2021)

 Australia
 Queen Elizabeth Stakes - (2) True Self (2019, 2020)

 Great Britain
King George VI Chase  -(2)  Florida Pearl (2001), Tornado Flyer (2021)
Tingle Creek Chase  -(1)  Un de Sceaux (2016)
Christmas Hurdle  -(2) Faugheen (2014,2015)     
Tolworth Hurdle  -(1)  Yorkhill (2016) 
Clarence House Chase  -(3)  Un de Sceaux (2016, 2017, 2018)
Scilly Isles Novices' Chase  -(1) Gitane Du Berlais  (2015)  
Anniversary 4-Y-O Novices' Hurdle  -(1) Apple's Jade (2016)  
Betway Bowl  -(2) Florida Pearl (2002), Kemboy (2019)
Aintree Hurdle  -(1) Annie Power (2016)
Melling Chase  -(2) Boston Bob (2014), Min (2019)
Mersey Novices' Hurdle  -(2) Nichols Canyon (2015), Yorkhill (2016)
Maghull Novices' Chase  -(2)  Douvan (2016), Gentleman De Mee (2022)

 United States
 Peapack Hurdle Stakes - (1) Pravalaguna (2019)

 France
 Grande Course de Haies d'Auteuil -(5) Nobody Told Me (2003), Rule Supreme (2004), Thousand Stars (2011, 2012), Benie des Dieux (2019)
 Prix Alain du Breil             -(2) Diakali (2013), Footpad (2016)
 Grand Prix d'Automne            -(1) Thousand Stars (2015)

 Japan
 Nakayama Grand Jump              -(1) Blackstairmountain (2013)

Major wins as a jockey
 Ireland
 December Festival Hurdle - (1) Grabel (1988)

 Great Britain
 Champion Bumper - (1) Wither or Which (1996)

References

External links
Willie Mullins' Official Website
Willie Mullins' Cheltenham Festival Winners
Willie Mullins' Horses in training

Living people
1956 births
Irish racehorse trainers
Sportspeople from County Carlow